The Idealist is a 2015 Danish thriller film directed by Christina Rosendahl about the investigation into medical problems of workers who cleaned up after the 1968 Thule Air Base B-52 crash.

Cast 
 Peter Plaugborg - Poul Brink
 Søren Malling - Marius Schmidt
 Thomas Bo Larsen - Carl Dinesen
 Arly Jover - Estibaliz
 Jens Albinus - Blicher
  - Pontoppidan - doctor
  - Ole Damgaard

References

External links 

2015 thriller films
Danish thriller films
2010s Danish-language films
2010s English-language films
2015 multilingual films
Danish multilingual films
Films directed by Christina Rosendahl